Francis Sherman Currey (June 29, 1925 – October 8, 2019) was a United States Army technical sergeant and a recipient of the United States military's highest decoration for valor, the Medal of Honor, for his heroic actions during the Battle of the Bulge in World War II.

Early life
Currey was born in Loch Sheldrake, New York, on June 29, 1925. After being orphaned at age 12, he was raised by foster parents on a farm in nearby Hurleyville. He joined the United States Army at age 17, one week after graduating Hurleyville High School. Although he completed Officer Candidate School, at only 18 years old, his superiors felt that he was "too immature" to be an officer and denied him a commission.

World War II

Currey landed at Omaha Beach in July 1944, a few weeks after D-Day. On 18 October, he was assigned as a replacement without winter gear (he later suffered from frostbite) to 3rd Platoon, K Company, 120th Infantry Regiment, 30th Infantry Division, at Herzogenrath, Germany. He saw his first combat action that month. Six weeks later, he was a sergeant and 3rd Platoon Leader in K Company. On December 21, 1944, Private First Class Currey was an automatic rifleman in a rifle squad which was guarding a bridge crossing and strongpoint. He repeatedly exposed himself to hostile fire while firing upon and killing several German infantrymen during an early morning German tank advance in Malmedy, Belgium. During the attack, he used a bazooka and anti-tank grenades which caused four enemy tank crews to abandon their tanks and also enabled him to rescue five comrades who had been pinned down in a building by enemy fire. After the Battle of the Bulge, he became a squad leader, and was awarded the Silver Star for gallantry in action at his regiment's command post.

In March 1945, Currey's company commander recommended him for the Medal of Honor for his actions on December 21. The Medal of Honor was presented to Currey on July 27, 1945, by the 30th Infantry Division division commander, Major General Leland Hobbs, near Reims, France; the medal was officially awarded to him on August 17, 1945. After the war was over in Europe, he received his third Purple Heart for being shot in Bavaria while disarming German soldiers. He returned to the United States in August as a first sergeant after occupational duty and a stop in England aboard the Queen Mary.

Later life
Currey worked as a counselor at the Veterans Affairs Medical Center in Albany, New York, from 1950 until he retired as a supervisor in 1980. After he retired from Veterans Affairs, he started and ran a landscaping business. He also worked at a hotel booking conventions in Myrtle Beach, South Carolina, until 2002.

Currey died on October 8, 2019, in Selkirk, New York.

Military awards
Currey's military awards and decorations:

Medal of Honor citation 
Currey's official Medal of Honor citation reads:

Rank and organization: Sergeant, U.S. Army, Company K, 120th Infantry, 30th Infantry Division
Place and date: Malmedy, Belgium, December 21, 1944
Entered service at: Hurleyville, N.Y.
Birth: Loch Sheldrake, N.Y.
G.O. No. 69, August 17, 1945

Other honors
 In 1998, the first Medal of Honor G.I. Joe action figure was modeled after Currey. 
 In 2006, Currey became a member of the New York State Senate Veterans' Hall of Fame.
 In 2013, an outside mural of Currey was unveiled in his honor as a living Medal of Honor recipient at the Sullivan Country Museum in Hurleyville.
 In November 2013, Currey's photo was one of 12 photos of Medal of Honor recipients on the cover sheet of a U.S. Postal Service "World War II Medal of Honor Forever Stamp" packet of 20 Medal of Honor stamps.

See also

List of Medal of Honor recipients for World War II

References

External links

1925 births
2019 deaths
People from Fallsburg, New York
United States Army personnel of World War II
United States Army Medal of Honor recipients
United States Army soldiers
World War II recipients of the Medal of Honor
Military personnel from New York (state)